is a 1934 silent film directed by Yasujirō Ozu which he later remade as Floating Weeds in 1959 in color.  It won the Kinema Junpo Award for best film.

Plot
The film starts with a travelling kabuki troupe arriving by train at a provincial seaside town.  Kihachi Ichikawa (Takeshi Sakamoto), the head of the troupe, is a very popular actor.  He takes time off to visit a former mistress Otsune (Chōko Iida), with whom he had a son years before.  His son, now a student, does not know that Kihachi is his father, thinking him an uncle.  Kihachi and his son, Shinkichi, spend a fruitful afternoon fishing for dace in a nearby river.

When the troupe's performance tour is postponed by the constant downpour around the region, one of the members of the troupe unwittingly reveals a secret: that Kihachi is seeing a woman every day. Otaka (Rieko Yagumo), one of Kihachi’s actresses and his present mistress, decides to pay a visit to Otsune's watering-hole with fellow actress Otoki (Yoshiko Tsubouchi).  Kihachi becomes enraged, warns Otaka never to come and harass the mother and son again, and breaks off his relationship with her.

To get back at Otsune and Kihachi, Otaka suggests to Otoki to try to seduce Shinkichi and offers her some money.  Otoki waits for Shinkichi at a tree by the road one day and offers to meet after her performance at the same place.  Shinkichi agrees to the meeting, and the two start a clandestine love affair.

As time goes by, Otoki realizes she has fallen for Shinkichi.  She tells Shinkichi to forget her because she is merely a traveling actress.  Kihachi discovers their affair, confronts Otoki and slaps her, demanding to know what she wants.  Otoki reveals Otaka's setup, but tells him she now loves Shinkichi and is not doing this for money.  Kihachi then beats up Otaka, but realizes he no longer has any control over the affair.
 
Kihachi decides to disband the troupe, selling all their costumes and props.  The kabuki actors have one last night together.  Kihachi visits Otsune, and tells her of his troupe's break-up.  She invites him to stay with her for good, and they decide to tell Shinkichi of his paternity secret.  Shinkichi and Otoki return, but Shinkichi and Kihachi get into a violent quarrel when Kihachi hits Otoki repeatedly.

Otsune now tells Shinkichi that Kihachi is his father, but Shinkichi refuses to acknowledge him for abandoning them.  Otsune reasons that Kihachi doesn't want Shinkichi to become a traveling actor like him.  Shinkichi leaves for his room in a huff.  Kihachi decides to restart another troupe, realizing he cannot stay.  Otoki asks to join him, but Kihachi leaves her in Otsune's care and asks Otoki to help his son be a great man.

Shinkichi comes down to look for his father but he has gone on the road.  At the railway station, Kihachi meets Otaka who helps light his cigarette with matches.  He invites her to start a new traveling troupe with him at Kamisuwa.  Otaka goes to buy an extra ticket to accompany him.  The film ends with a shot of a train traveling toward Kamisuwa.

Themes
The film includes the first appearance of what became one of the director's trademarks: a title sequence in which the credits appear against a sackcloth backdrop. Not only does this fit the story's pastoral setting, but since the credit sequences of Ozu's previous films had featured cartoony illustrations, the choice of humble sackcloth indicates the emergence of his mature film-making style.

Cast
 Takeshi Sakamoto as Kihachi
 Chōko Iida as Otsune, Ka-yan
 Kōji Mitsui as Shinkichi (credited as Hideo Mitsui)
 Rieko Yagumo as Otaka
 Yoshiko Tsubouchi as Otoki
 Tomio Aoki as Tomi-boh
 Reikô Tani as Tomibo's father

Rest of cast listed alphabetically:
 Kiyoshi Aono as Sword trainer
 Mariko Aoyama as Barber's landlady
 Mitsumura Ikebe as Villager
 Seiji Nishimura as Kichi, an actor
 Mitsuru Wakamiya as Station attendant

DVD release
A Story of Floating Weeds was released on Region 1 DVD on The Criterion Collection on April 20, 2004 as a two-disc set with Floating Weeds. An alternate audio track contains a commentary by Japanese film historian Donald Richie; another features a new score by composer Donald Sosin.

Legacy
In 2005, the New York Guitar Festival commissioned the guitarist Alex de Grassi to compose a score to A Story of Floating Weeds. The guitarist performed his original music to accompany the film at the 2006 New York Guitar Festival.

References

External links

 
Stories of Floating Weeds an essay by Donald Richie at the Criterion Collection
 

1934 films
Japanese silent films
Japanese black-and-white films
Films directed by Yasujirō Ozu
1930s Japanese-language films
Shochiku films
Best Film Kinema Junpo Award winners
Films with screenplays by Tadao Ikeda
Films with screenplays by Yasujirō Ozu
Japanese drama films
1934 drama films
Silent drama films